Steve Wood (born 2 February 1963) is an English former football defender.

Wood started his career as an apprentice at Arsenal but was then snapped up by Reading for whom he had eight successful years gaining promotion to the then first division. He then moved to Millwall for £85,000, and finally onto Southampton for £400,000. He had a brief spells at Oxford United and Woking in the latter part of his career then retired.

He now runs his own football representation company, Midas Sports, where they look after more than 100 clients.

Career statistics

Notes

Honours
Southampton
Full Members Cup finalist: 1992

References

External links

Since 1888... The Searchable Premiership and Football League Player Database (subscription required)

1963 births
Living people
English footballers
Association football defenders
English Football League players
Premier League players
Reading F.C. players
Millwall F.C. players
Southampton F.C. players
Oxford United F.C. players
Woking F.C. players